Overachievers are individuals who "perform better or achieve more success than expected." The implicit presumption is that the "overachiever" is achieving superior results through excessive effort. In a teaching context, an "overachiever" is an educational label applied to students, who perform better than their peers when normalized for the instructor's perceptions of background, intelligence or talent. In the workplace context, individuals who are deemed to be overachievers are those with the drive to complete tasks above and beyond expectations and who set very high career goals for themselves. The opposite term is underachiever.

In educational settings

Primary and secondary school
In an educational context, "overachiever" is defined as "a student who attains higher standards than the IQ indicated." Overachievers are generally contrasted with underachievers, who perform less well than the instructor thinks they should given their intelligence. An Encyclopedia of Psychology notes that “[g]enerally, these terms are not used by either educators or psychologists.” While the concept of over- and underachievers has wide acceptance among practicing teachers, it remains a controversial topic on several points:
 Both are labels which implicitly affect teacher behavior.  This frequently leads the labels to become self-fulfilling prophecies.
 The labels are based on a static and incomplete understanding of the nature of intelligence.  The ability to concentrate and to work in a dedicated manner cannot be separated from a person's "native" or "raw" intelligence in any meaningfully testable way.

A 2007 book about overachievement describes the "cult of overachieving that is prevalent in many middle- and upper-class schools", in which "students are obsessed with success, contending with illness, physical deterioration." "When teenagers inevitably look at themselves through the prism of our overachiever culture," the author writes, "they often come to the conclusion that no matter how much they achieve, it will never be enough.""

Colleges and universities
For college and university students, "there is a fine line between being a high achiever and an overachiever." In the US, "an increasing number of college students are literally making themselves sick in the pursuit of perfection", by setting "self-imposed but unrealistically high standards." According to Dr. Modupe Akin-Deko, senior psychologist at Buffalo State College's counseling center, "… maladaptive perfectionists set themselves up for failure by setting impossible standards for themselves, thus lowering their self esteem when they never reach their goals." Clinical psychologist Marilyn Sorenson, in her book Breaking the Chain of Low Self-Esteem, maintains that people with low self-esteem often find themselves driven to overachieve to build self-worth.

In the workplace

In the workplace, "overachievers have the drive, determination, passion, and energy needed to move huge projects forward." "Overachievers increasingly take on new projects and drive themselves to perfection, often becoming known as 'workaholics'." For workplace overachievers, "completing tasks above and beyond expectations provides the same physical and mental high as a drug." However, managers need to deal with the negative side of the overachiever personality: the overachiever employee may "set unrealistic expectations, work insane hours, and take risks to succeed at any cost", which can lead the employee to "become obsessed, dysfunctional, and ultimately unable to perform." Other issues with overachievers are that they "… typically forget to communicate vital information, often take shortcuts, and leave the details to someone else." As well, overachievers often "have difficulties interacting socially" and they are "at high risk for burnout".

According to "Dr. Richard Rawson, associate director of UCLA's Integrated Substance Abuse Programs, [methamphetamine] … is popular with workers in overachieving, highly productive economies such as those in Japan and South Korea." Methamphetamines "have graduated into a formidable problem in the workplace"; in the US, the California Bar Association "says one in four lawyers who voluntarily enters drug rehabilitation programs is addicted to methamphetamines."

According to psychologist Arthur P. Ciaramicoli, there is a "curse of the capable," which is "a complex web of emotions that drives people to hide their genuine needs behind a mask of over-achievement." He claims people often seek "the "quick fix" of over-achievement to compensate for wounded self-esteem." As well, he states that "chronically-overachieving people often don't realize unrecognized needs are driving them from the healing conditions necessary for fulfilled lives." He says that "compulsive overachieving can stimulate production of dopamine"; however these "temporary "lifts" will pass, triggering a spiraling non-fulfilling cycle of achievement and disappointment." He claims that "the drive for status to overcome psychological wounds generally leads to other problems such as poor nutrition, weight gain, excessive reliance on caffeine, alcohol or other harmful substances and sleep deprivation."

Figurative usages of term
The term "overachievement" is occasionally applied in other contexts; for example, a country with an unsustainably high per capita income might be described as "overachieving". In sports, players or teams that significantly exceed the general preseason expectations for them are called "overachievers." Promotional materials and reviews for consumer products sometimes refer to products as "overachievers."

See also
Giftedness
Discrimination of excellence
 John Henryism
 Minority stress
 Model minority

References

Further reading
 Alexandra Robbins. The Overachievers: The Secret Lives of Driven Kids. Hyperion Books, 2007

Giftedness
Educational psychology
Employee relations